Jorma Juhani Panula (born 10 August 1930) is a Finnish conductor, composer, and teacher of conducting. He has mentored many Finnish conductors, such as Esa-Pekka Salonen, Mikko Franck, Sakari Oramo, Jukka-Pekka Saraste, Osmo Vänskä and Klaus Mäkelä.

Career
Panula was born in Kauhajoki. He studied church music and conducting at the Sibelius Academy. His teachers included Leo Funtek, Dean Dixon, Albert Wolff and Franco Ferrara. Apart from conducting, he has composed a wide variety of music. His operas Jaakko Ilkka and the River Opera established a new genre called "performance opera", which fused music, visual art and the art of daily life. Panula's other compositions include musicals, church music, a violin concerto, jazz capriccio and numerous pieces of vocal music.

Panula was the artistic director and chief conductor of the Turku Philharmonic Orchestra from 1963 to 1965, the Helsinki Philharmonic Orchestra from 1965 to 1972 and the Aarhus Symphony Orchestra from 1973 to 1976. He has also conducted his own opera Jaakko Ilkka at the Finnish National Opera.

Panula has served as Professor of Conducting at the Sibelius Academy in Helsinki from 1973 to 1994 and at the Royal College of Music in Stockholm and the Royal Danish Academy of Music in Copenhagen. As a pedagogue, Panula has been a teacher and mentor to many Finnish conductors, including Esa-Pekka Salonen, Mikko Franck, Sakari Oramo, Jukka-Pekka Saraste, Osmo Vänskä, Dalia Stasevska, and Klaus Mäkelä.

He has taught conducting courses all over the world, such as in Paris, London, Amsterdam, Moscow, New York, Tanglewood, Aspen, Ottawa and Sydney. Panula was listed as one of the "60 most powerful people in music" featured in the November 2000 issue of BBC Music Magazine. Panula was awarded the Rolf Schock Prize in 1997. He conducted the Helsinki City Symphony Orchestra in the première in December 1971 of the first symphony by Aulis Sallinen.

In March 2014, Panula caused controversy in a Finnish television interview with remarks that denigrated the ability of women to conduct particular composers, and that women were suited to conducting music that was "feminine enough", such as Debussy, but that they were unsuited for conducting Bruckner. He stated that "women [conductors]… Of course they are trying! Some of them are making faces, sweating and fussing, but it is not getting any better – only worse!... It’s not a problem – if they choose the right pieces. If they take more feminine music... This is a purely biological question.” Other conductors, such as his former student Salonen, responded critically to Panula's remarks.

References

1930 births
Living people
People from Kauhajoki
Finnish composers
Finnish male composers
Finnish conductors (music)
Rolf Schock Prize laureates
Sibelius Academy alumni
Academic staff of Sibelius Academy
21st-century conductors (music)
21st-century male musicians